Stanbic IBTC Holdings, commonly referred to as Stanbic IBTC, is a financial service holding company in Nigeria with subsidiaries in Banking, Stock Brokerage, Investment Advisory, Asset Management, Investor Services, Pension Management, Trustees Insurance Brokerage and life Insurance businesses. The company's corporate headquarters, I.B.T.C. Place, is situated at Walter Carrington Crescent, Victoria Island, Lagos. Stanbic IBTC Holdings is a member of the Standard Bank Group, a financial services giant based in South Africa. Standard Bank is Africa's largest banking group ranked by assets and earnings, operations in 20 African countries and 13 countries outside Africa.

Overview
Stanbic IBTC Holdings PLC. came to being as the result of a merger between Stanbic Bank Nigeria Limited and IBTC Chartered Bank Plc. in 2007, then adopting a holding company structure in 2012 to comply with the revised regulatory framework advised by the Central Bank of Nigeria, requiring banks to either divest from non-core banking financial services or adopt a holdings' company structure.

Before the Merger

IBTC Chartered Bank Plc. 
Investment Banking & Trust Company Plc (IBTC) was formed as an investment bank on 2 February 1989 with Atedo N.A. Peterside as chief executive officer. 
In 2005, the Central Bank of Nigeria announced its re-capitalization program for commercial banks. This meant that all commercial banks had to have a NGN 25 billion minimum capital base. This CBN order led to the merger of Investment Banking and Trust Company (IBTC) with Chartered Bank Plc and Regent Bank Plc on 19 December 2005 to form IBTC Chartered Bank Plc with a total asset base NGN 125 billion  and listed on the Nigerian Stock Exchange.

Stanbic Bank Nigeria Limited 
Stanbic Bank Nigeria Limited was founded in 1991 when Standard Bank Investment Corporation (Stanbic Bank), acquired the African operations of ANZ Grindlays Bank. The name was later changed to Stanbic Bank Nigeria Limited and was a wholly owned subsidiary of Stanbic Africa Holdings Limited (SAHL).

The Merger
On 24 September 2007, IBTC Chartered Bank Plc merged with Stanbic Bank Nigeria Limited. Stanbic Africa Holdings Limited (SAHL)on behalf of Standard Bank tendered an offer for the acquisition of additional IBTC shares in order to attain majority shares in the merged business. This resulted in SAHL having a majority shareholding 50.75% up from 33.33% as at the merger date. 
The business name was subsequently changed to Stanbic IBTC Holdings Plc and resumed trading on the NSE.

Member Companies
The companies that comprise Stanbic IBTC Holdings include the following:

 Stanbic IBTC Bank – A commercial bank in Nigeria, serving individuals and businesses, and regulated by the Central Bank of Nigeria
 Stanbic IBTC Pension Managers Limited – A leading Pension Fund Administrator (PFA) in Nigeria.
 Stanbic IBTC Asset Management Limited – Providing asset management services. It was incorporated in 1992.
 Stanbic IBTC Stockbrokers Limited – Providing Stock brokerage service.
 Stanbic IBTC Trustees Limited – Specializes in trusteeship and estate management.
 Stanbic IBTC Capital Limited –  Offers Investment banking services.
 Stanbic IBTC Insurance Brokers – Operates as the insurance brokerage arm of the group.
Stanbic IBTC Insurance Limited – Provide Insurance services. 
Stanbic IBTC Nominees – Acts as custodian in money market and fixed income securities for the Nigerian market.

Ownership
The stock of Stanbic IBTC Holdings listed on the NSE, where it trades under the symbol: STANBIC Shareholding in the group's stock is depicted in the table below:

Governance
The running of Stanbic IBTC Holding is overseen by a 12-person board of directors (9 non-executive and 3 executive) with Mr. Basil Omiyi as the chairman.

See also
 Stanbic Bank
 Standard Bank Group
 Nigerian Stock Exchange
 List of banks in Nigeria
 List of banks in Africa

References

External links
 Stanbic IBTC Holding
 Standard Bank Group

Banks of Nigeria
Standard Bank Group
Banks established in 1989
Companies based in Lagos
Financial services companies established in 1989
Holding companies of Nigeria
Nigerian companies established in 1989
Nigerian subsidiaries of foreign companies